The Artois-Baillet Latour Foundation is a Belgian non-profit organization which was founded on 1 March 1974.

History 

The foundation was born  by the initiative of Count Alfred de Baillet Latour, who was the Director of the Artois Breweries in Leuven, Belgium. He was the last male heir of the old House of Baillet, and was by motherside related to the House of Spoelberch, who own the Artois Company. In 1995 the name was changed in Interbrew-Baillet Latour Foundation and in 2005, the name was changed to InBev-Baillet Latour Fund.

The Foundation wants to encourage and reward achievements of outstanding human value in the Arts and Sciences. It can do this by means of Prizes, or by any other means that the Foundation might deem appropriate.

InBev-Baillet Latour Health Prize
The Artois-Baillet Latour Health Prize was established in 1977 to be awarded periodically to recognize the merits of a person whose work has contributed prominently to the improvement of human health in the fields of metabolic disorders, infectious diseases, neurological diseases, cancer and cardiovascular disease. Since 2000 the prize has been awarded annually. Worth 250,000 euros, it is Belgium's major scientific prize. Since 2005, it has been known as the InBev-Baillet Latour Health Prize.

Health Prize Laureates
Source: 
2018 Professor Laurence Zitvogel, University of Paris-Sud and Professor Guido Kroemer, Paris Descartes University (cancer)
2017 Professor , Zürich University (neurological disorders)
2016 Professor Charles M. Rice, Rockefeller University  (infectious diseases)
2015 Professor Bruce M. Spiegelman, Harvard Medical School (metabolic disorders)
2014 Professor , Johns Hopkins University (cardiovascular disease)
2013 Professor Carlo M. Croce, Ohio State University (cancer)
2012 Professor Gero Miesenböck, University of Oxford (neurological disorders)
2011 Professor , Rockefeller University (infectious diseases)
2010 Professor Stephen O'Rahilly, University of Cambridge
2009 Professor Kari Alitalo, University of Helsinki and Professor , University of Kuopio
2008 Professor Robert A. Weinberg, Whitehead Institute for Biomedical Research, Cambridge, Massachusetts, United States of America
2007 Professor , Max-Planck-Institute for Medical Research, Heidelberg, Germany
2006 Professor Hidde Ploegh, Whitehead Institute, Massachusetts Institute of Technology (MIT), United States of America
2005 Professors Désiré Collen and Peter Carmeliet, Katholieke Universiteit Leuven and the VIB, Belgium
2004 Professor , Bologna, Italy
2003 Professor Nancy C. Andreasen, Iowa City, United States of America
2002 Professor , Austin, United States of America
2001 Dr , Laboratory for Infectious Diseases, Rijksinstituut voor Volksgezondheid en Milieu, Bilthoven, the Netherlands 
1999 Professor  of the Université Libre de Bruxelles, Brussels, Belgium
1997 Professor Michael Sela, Weizmann Institute of Science, Rehovot, Israel.
1995 Professor Roger Tsien, University of California, San Diego, United States of America
1993 Professor Jean-François Borel, University of Bern, Switzerland
1991 Professor , National Cancer Institute, Bethesda, United States of America
1989 Professor Walter Fiers, University of Ghent, Belgium
1987 Professors  and Tomas Hökfelt (Karolinska Institute, Stockholm, Sweden)
1985 Professor Johannes J. van Rood, the Netherlands
1983 Professor Jean Bernard, France
1981 Sir Cyril A. Clarke, Great Britain
1979 Sir James W. Black, Great Britain

See also
 National Fund for Scientific Research (FWO, FNRS)
 Francqui Prize
 House of Baillet
 List of medicine awards
 Olivaint Conference of Belgium

References

External links
 InBev-Baillet Latour

Medicine awards
Foundations based in Belgium
Organizations established in 1974
Awards established in 1979
Belgian awards